North West Frontier may refer to:

 A border area of the British Indian Empire in the 19th century, see Military history of the North-West Frontier
 North-West Frontier Province (1901–2010), a province of British India and later of Pakistan
 Khyber Pakhtunkhwa, the current province of Pakistan since 2010
 North West Frontier (film), a 1959 British adventure film starring Lauren Bacall

See also
 
 North-West Frontier States Agency